Coagulation factor VII (formerly known as proconvertin) is one of the proteins that causes blood to clot in the coagulation cascade, and in humans is coded for by the gene F7.  It is an enzyme of the serine protease class. Once bound to tissue factor released from damaged tissues, it is converted to factor VIIa (or blood-coagulation factor VIIa, activated blood coagulation factor VII), which in turn activates factor IX and factor X.

Using genetic recombination a recombinant factor VIIa (eptacog alfa) (trade names include NovoSeven) has been approved by the FDA for the control of bleeding in hemophilia. It is sometimes used unlicensed in severe uncontrollable bleeding, although there have been safety concerns. A biosimilar form of recombinant activated factor VII (AryoSeven) is also available, but does not play any considerable role in the market.

In April 2020, the US FDA approved a new rFVIIa product, eptacog beta (SEVENFACT), the first bypassing agent (BPA) approved in more than 2 decades. As an rFVIIa product, eptacog beta works in a complex with tissue factor to activate factor X to Xa, thereby bypassing FVIII and FIX. The activation of Factor X to Xa initiates the coagulation cascade’s common pathway, leading to clot formation at the site of hemorrhage. Activated FVII binds to endothelial protein C receptor (EPCR), which enhances hemostasis.14 One study showed that eptacog beta binds to EPCR with 25% to 30% more affinity than eptacog alfa, displacing protein C from EPCR binding sites and downregulating activated protein C generation, contributing to its hemostatic effect.

Physiology 

The main role of factor VII (FVII) is to initiate the process of coagulation in conjunction with tissue factor (TF/factor III). Tissue factor is found on the outside of blood vessels - normally not exposed to the bloodstream. Upon vessel injury, tissue factor is exposed to the blood and circulating factor VII. Once bound to TF, FVII is activated to FVIIa by different proteases, among which are thrombin (factor IIa), factor Xa, IXa, XIIa, and the FVIIa-TF complex itself. The complex of factor VIIa with TF catalyzes the conversion of factor IX and factor X into the active proteases, factor IXa and factor Xa, respectively.

The action of the factor is impeded by tissue factor pathway inhibitor (TFPI), which is released almost immediately after initiation of coagulation. Factor VII, which was discovered around 1950, is vitamin K-dependent and produced in the liver. Use of warfarin or similar anticoagulants decreases hepatic synthesis of FVII.

A coagulation enzyme cascade may begin with a few molecules of factor XII and culminate in the activation of millions of times more fibrin molecules.

Structure 

Factor VII shares a common domain architecture with factors IX and X.

Genetics 

The gene for factor VII is located on chromosome 13 (13q34).

Role in disease 

Factor VII deficiency (congenital proconvertin deficiency) is rare and inherited recessively.  It presents as a hemophilia-like bleeding disorder.  It is treated with recombinant factor VIIa (NovoSeven or AryoSeven). Gene therapy approaches for treating FVII deficiency are very promising

Medical uses 

Recombinant factor VIIa, marketed under the trade names AryoSeven and NovoSeven, is used for people with hemophilia (with Factor VIII or IX deficiency) who have developed antibodies against replacement coagulation factor.

It has also been used in the setting of uncontrollable hemorrhage, but its role in this setting is controversial with insufficient evidence to support its use outside of clinical trials. The first report of its use in hemorrhage was in an Israeli soldier with uncontrollable bleeding in 1999. Risks of its use include an increase in arterial thrombosis. However, animal studies have not shown complications as seen in humans, in fact same of the studies show a better prognosis. In the military settings it is used as an off label intervention in complications related to disseminated intravascular coagulation related haemorrhage caused by penetrating trauma.

Recombinant human factor VII while initially looking promising in intracerebral hemorrhage failed to show benefit following further study and this is no longer recommended.

Interactions 

Factor VII has been shown to interact with tissue factor and protein kinase C.

References

Further reading

External links 
 Official website
 The MEROPS online database for peptidases and their inhibitors: S01.215
 CHES - Comprehensive Health Education Services LLC - Factor VII treatment and awareness 

Coagulation system
EC 3.4.21
Peripheral membrane proteins